Bermanella is a bacteria genus from the family of Oceanospirillaceae, with one known species (Bermanella marisrubri).

References

Oceanospirillales
Monotypic bacteria genera
Bacteria genera